Flavobacterium crassostreae is a Gram-negative and rod-shaped bacterium from the genus of Flavobacterium which has been isolated from a Pacific oyster.

References

External links
Type strain of Flavobacterium crassostreae at BacDive -  the Bacterial Diversity Metadatabase

crassostreae
Bacteria described in 2017